Mohammad Abadi  (born 3 September 1990) is a Syrian footballer for Al Futowa.

References

External links
 
 

1990 births
Living people
People from Deir ez-Zor
Syrian footballers
Syria international footballers

Association football forwards
Syrian Premier League players